"Timebomb" is a song recorded by Australian recording artist Kylie Minogue. It was released as a stand-alone single on 25 May 2012 by Parlophone, and distributed in both physical and digital formats. It was released as part of Minogue's anniversary for her 25th year in the music industry. The track was written by Karen Poole, Matt Schwartz and Paul Harris, whilst production was handled by the latter two collaborators; another track with the same title was written for Minogue by American recording artist Michael Jackson. In 2012 it was included as part of the K25: Time Capsule singles box set. However the song received its first widespread album debut on the 2019 collection Step Back in Time: The Definitive Collection.

Musically, "Timebomb" is a dance song that incorporates elements of synthpop, disco and electro. Sonically compared to the work of American singer Britney Spears and British recording artist Jay Sean, the lyrical content focuses on having fun and dancing before hypothetically running out of time. Upon its release, "Timebomb" was universally praised from music critics. Majority of them commended the dance sound and production, whilst some critics even selected it as an example of Minogue's best work. Commercially, it performed moderately in most regions such as Australia, United Kingdom, Spain, Belgium, Japan, and New Zealand. It managed to reach the top spot on the US Billboard Dance Club Songs chart.

An accompanying music video was directed by Christian Larson in Soho, London; it featured Minogue walking around the streets during day and night, and other scenes of her dancing in a small room. The video was also praised from music critics, who complimented Minogue's sex appeal and the video's visuals. To promote the single, Minogue performed the track during the semi-final of The Voice UKs first season, and appeared on the setlist for Minogue's Kiss Me Once concert tour.

Background and release

Minogue announced her celebration of 25 years in the music industry by setting up a year-long commemoration titled K25; this featured a variety of events including the release of new music, album releases, product endorsement, amongst others. In early May 2012, Minogue set up a special website where her fans had to use Twitter and hashtag the word "KylieTimebomb" in order to unlock the track; Minogue's label Parlophone commented that the hashtag was one of the top ten trending topics worldwide that same month on Twitter. "Timebomb" was then released on 25 May 2012, three days before Minogue's 44th birthday; Digital Spy editor Christian Tobin premiered the track with a 90-second preview.

It was written by Karen Poole, Matt Schwartz and Paul Harris, whilst production was handled by the latter two collaborators. Initially after its announcement, it caused an online stir with Minogue's fan base after finding out that another track with the same title was written by American recording artist Michael Jackson, intended for her eighth studio album Fever (2001); it was later clarified by Minogue that the 2012 track was not written by Jackson. Minogue originally wanted "Timebomb" to appear on her 12th studio album Kiss Me Once (2014), but Parlophone scrapped the idea.

"Timebomb" was released as a stand-alone single on 25 May 2012 by Parlophone, and distributed in both physical and digital formats; it later appeared as a mini CD on Minogue's box set compilation K25: Time Capsule in October 2012. The track was sent to radio stations in New Zealand on 29 May, whilst Minogue's American label Astralwerks released the track in the United States and Canada the following day. On 25 June, due to high demand by Minogue's fan base, Parlophone distributed a CD single that included the original recording, an extended version, and an enhanced music video; it was limited to 5,000 copies worldwide, with 10 of those copies signed by Minogue herself. On 13 July, Parlophone issued a digital remix EP that consisted five remixes of "Timebomb" and the extended edit. Parlophone distributed the remixes as a promotional CD single in both the United States and Greece, whilst the label distributed the original CD single to Japan that same day.

Composition

Musically, "Timebomb" is a dance song, as described by Katherine St Asaph at PopDust.com. It was recorded at Destined Studios at West End London, United Kingdom by Matt Schwartz. Schwartz and Harris produced the record while Schwartz served as the track programmer and mixing engineer. Karen Poole, who co-wrote the track, provided backing vocals. According to the sheet music published at Musicnotes.com by Universal Music Publishing, the song is written in the key of G Major and is set in time signature of common time with a tempo of 128 beats per minute; Minogue's vocals span between G4 and G5.

Lyrically, the song focuses on having fun and dancing before hypothetically running out of time; in further detail, St Asaph exemplified the lyric "Fast, time is ticking oh so fast," and said "how it's really, really necessary to get all your dancing done before impending disaster/apocalypse/time-bomb explosions." However, Jude Rogers noted that the chorus lyrics "We're on a timebomb, we might not last long, so let's just do it right now," was a reference about sex. St Asaph continued to analyse Minogue's vocals by describing them as "chopped", "quantizied", and "slicked with syrup and backing vocals".

Cameron Adams from Herald Sun described the track as "upbeat pop" that hinted a "dark and dirty electro feel." Similarly, Cameron Matthews, writing for AOL Music, felt the composition showcased a "club-bumping beat". Digital Spy's Robert Copsey labelled the track as "disco-pop", whilst St Asaph described the tempo as "energetic". Staff members at American music website Idolator compared the song's "apocalyptic"-theme to the songs "Till the World Ends" by American recording artist Britney Spears, and "2012 (It Ain't the End)" by British singer Jay Sean; the review also said "In any case, it's a nice return to the seductive minimalism that made 'Can't Get You Out of My Head' such disco-ball dynamite. Similarly, Melina Newman from HitFix compared the composition and tempo to the early work of American artist Madonna, commenting, "The dance tune has an early Madonna flair to it with a catchy, fuzzy synth beat line holding much of it together."

Critical response
"Timebomb" received universal acclaim from most music critics. Robert Copsey from Digital Spy gave it a positive review, awarding four stars out of five. Copsey enjoyed how the dance composition was similar to Minogue's previous work, describing it as "back to basics", and concluding "In that time she has rarely strayed from the very centre of the dancefloor, so it's hardly surprisingly that 'Timebomb' feels like a gentle jog in the park for her". He also compared the composition to her previous singles "Come into My World" and "Love at First Sight" and labelled it as an "instant disco-pop perfection". Bradley Stern labelled Minogue as "Bad bitch Kylie" on his website MuuMuse, which was an alias that defined periods of Minogue's re-inventions; he labelled it a "ferocious pop smash", called it "very signature Kylie too", and awarded the single four-and-a-half stars out of five. American journalist and personality Perez Hilton labelled "Timebomb" as a "fast-paced, electrified, club track dropped into our laps!".

Writing for USA Today, Ann Oldenburg enjoyed the track and called it a "dance-ready single". Glenn Gamboa, writing for the magazine Newsday, labelled it a "pure fizzy dance pop... and a chorus you can't get out of your head." In a similar review, Cameron Matthews from AOL Music said the song "is sure to be an instant hit!". Cameron Adams wrote for the Australian newspaper Herald Sun, and stated that "[w]hile it is not instant as most Kylie singles, repeated listens implant the 'woooh' hook firmly." In a separate review at PopCrush, Amy Sciarretto named "Timebomb" one of the best dance songs of 2012 and concluded, "The 'Timebomb' may be ticking, but the remaining minutes of Minogue's career are not."

Similarly, Jenn Selby from Glamour listed it as one of the best tracks during the week of 25 May; she said "Told you we were feeling camp! Good job Kylie released her new dance pop single, 'Timebomb', this week too." Despite listing Carly Rae Jepsen's song "Call Me Maybe" on AfterElton.com's "The 10 Best 'Songs of the Summer' of the Past 20 Years", Louis Virtel stated he was not "thrilled" adding it to the list, stating, "I firmly believe the song of the summer—quality-wise, funk-wise, sass-wise—is Kylie Minogue's 'Timebomb,' but Billboard has other ideas." Virtel also wrote as a columnist for the website NewNowNext.com, hosted by Logo TV; he listed the track at number six on Minogue's Best Songs, and stated "'Timebomb' is a note-perfect, three-minute pop bullet; a dance anthem that wriggles into your nervous system and throbs even harder upon every new listen."

Chart performance

Commercially, "Timebomb" was a moderate success worldwide except the United States. It debuted at number 31 on the UK Singles Chart after two days of release, selling 10,044 units. It stalled at the same position for another week, but fell to 56 with sales of 6,770 units; it stayed in the top 100 for non-consecutive chart runs, and spent a total of 7 weeks, making it one of Minogue's lowest charting singles in that region. It reached number 38 on the UK Airplay Chart, and number 33 on the Scottish Singles Chart. In Australia, the single entered at number 12 on the Australian Singles Chart, but descended the following week to number 49 for its final week; this resulted as one of Minogue's lowest spanning charting singles in that region. Similarly in New Zealand, it spent a sole week at number 33 on the New Zealand Singles Chart, Minogue's first charting solo single since "2 Hearts" in 2007 and one of Minogue's lowest charting singles there.

In the Belgium regions of Flanders and Wallonia, it reached number 43 and number 49 on their Ultratop charts. The track fared better on both of their airplay, dance charts, and Bubbling Under Dance charts, peaking inside the top 40 in all categories in both regions respectively. The single performed similarly in Austria, France, the Netherlands and Spain, with peak positions inside of their top 50 charts. It also reached number 56 on the Germany Singles Chart, one of her lowest entries in that region. On the Rádio Top 100 charts in Slovakia and Czech Republic, hosted by the IFPI, "Timebomb" peaked at number 40 and number 89 respectively.

"Timebomb" peaked at number 86 on Russia's Tophit Airplay chart, whilst it peaked at number 45 on the Mexican Airplay chart hosted by Billboard magazine. It also reached number 19 on Hungary's Rádiós Top 40 chart, and 32 on Billboards Japan Hot 100 chart. The single was a success in the US Dance charts, debuting at number thirty-one on the Dance Club Songs; it eventually reached the top spot, becoming her ninth number one single on that chart. It also reached number 17 on both of Billboards Dance/Electronic Digital Songs and the Dance/Mix Show Airplay chart, and became Minogue's fastest-selling single in the US since "Can't Get You Out of My Head" in 2001. In Canada, it peaked at number 40 and number 73 on the Canadian Digital Songs chart and Canadian Hot 100, the latter hosted by Billboard.

Music video
The music video was directed and edited by Christian Larson, and was filmed on a rainy day through Soho, London; in early 2012, images of Minogue wearing a heart-shaped jacket and denim hot pants surfaced online. After the videos completion, Minogue hosted a special website that required her fans to use Twitter to hashtag "KylieTimebomb" in order to unlock the music video. The campaign was an extreme success on Twitter, with over 25,000 tweets in under an hour and 10 tweets per second and the hashtag was subjected as one of the trending topics worldwide. In an interview with Vevo.com, Minogue said of the shooting; "When we were shooting down the busiest street in Soho, I worked with an in-ear monitor. I must have looked like a complete idiot because I'm strutting down the street singing to absolutely nothing!" In an interview on Alan Carr: Chatty Man, she commented that the mini-black dress was purchased at a lingerie store, and further expressed discomforted saying, "That was a very cheeky little outfit. People don't believe it, but I do get very shy and timid. I was like, 'Oh god please, can't there be more to this?'". Minogue promoted the Facebook app that allowed fans to be inserted into Minogue's glasses, which are seen throughout the music video.

The video begins with Larson shooting Minogue in a small white room. After the shoot, she leaves the studio, wearing the leather jacket with a red heart featured on the single's artwork, and starts singing the song. She then walks through various London back-alleys, bumping into a man carrying a boombox, and taking a phone off a café table—showcasing a camera angle inspired by Instagram—, and arrives at a nightclub. Dancing there, she leaves the nightclub and continues walking down Old Compton Street, Soho. The street scenes are interspersed with distorted shots of Minogue dancing in a brightly lit, white room. Minogue then climbs into a car with a male driver, and the pair travel through London, along busy streets, where Minogue greets one of her fans in a nearby car.

Night falls, and she exits the car in Chinatown, London, pursued by an unknown man. She runs through an alley, and kisses a man, dragging him into a nearby building. She removes her jacket, revealing the black mini-dress, and dances seductively next to a motorcycle. They then both leave the building, with the man driving the motorcycle, and stop in a crowded street. Minogue dances on the back of the motorcycle, and in the middle of the street, while the man circles her, performing a wheelie. The video ends with the crowd looking on, as the pair perform a burnout, and leave the alley.

WhatCulture.com gave it a positive review for the song itself, but noted the lack of promotion on the single, stating; "Maybe Kylie’s management are more bothered about the K25 Antitour and upcoming Greatest Hits collection, which isn’t a bad thing at all, but it’s a shame a song and video as great as 'Timebomb' will probably be long forgotten in the pop aftermath a few months later." Daniella Graham from Metro.co.uk emphasized the hot pants Minogue wore in the video, and an iconic clothing piece in her career from her single "Spinning Around"; Graham titled their article "Kylie Minogue brings back the hotpants in new Timebomb video". Similar, an editor from The Huffington Post wrote that "[t]he pop princess [...] looks flawless in the new clip, strutting along busy thoroughfares in London's SoHo neighborhood in a pair of hot pants, before ducking into an alley and stripping down to a barely-there webbed dress." Jenna Rubenstein of MTV said positively, "There may not be much of a plot, but there's a ton of almost-naked Kylie, which is really all we were hoping for anyway." Keith Caulfield from Billboard  described Minogue and her fashion as "sexy".

Live performance
Minogue performed "Timebomb" for the first time at the semi-finals of The Voice in the United Kingdom. She wore the same outfit in the music video, and danced in front of graffiti walls and a giant heart on a video screen. The song was included on the setlist for her 2014 Kiss Me Once Tour in Europe and Australia, where it was used during the introduction segment. Minogue uploaded an official live video of the track on her YouTube channel, which featured her in a red dress singing in front of an infrastructure and back-up dancers. It appeared on the live DVD and CD of the tour, released on 23 March 2015.

Formats and track listings

 Digital download
 "Timebomb" – 2:57
 "Timebomb" (video) – 3:36

 CD single
 "Timebomb" – 2:57
 "Timebomb" (Extended version) – 4:30
 "Timebomb" (video) – 3:36

 Digital remix EP
 "Timebomb" (Extended Version) – 4:30
 "Timebomb" (Peter Rauhofer Remix) – 8:00
 "Timebomb" (DADA Remix) – 6:30
 "Timebomb" (Steve Redant & Phil Romano Remix) – 7:04
 "Timebomb" (Style of Eye Remix) – 6:31
 "Timebomb" (Italia3 Remix) – 6:00

Credits and personnel
Credits adapted from the CD liner notes of "Timebomb";

Recording
 Mixed and recorded at Destined Studios, London, England by Matt Schwartz

Personnel
 Kylie Minogue – vocals
 Karen Poole – songwriter, vocal production, backing vocals
 Paul Harris – songwriter, producer, instruments, arrangement, vocal production, programming, mixing assistant, recording assistant
 Matt Schwartz – songwriter, producer, instruments, arrangement, vocal production, programming, guitar, mixing, recording
 Christian Larson – music video director

Charts

Weekly charts

Year-end charts

Certifications

Release history

Standard history

See also
List of number-one dance singles of 2012 (U.S.)

References

2012 singles
2012 songs
Australian electronic dance music songs
Music videos shot in London
Kylie Minogue songs
Parlophone singles
Songs written by Karen Poole
Songs written by Matt Schwartz